The 1983–84 Thorn EMI Rugby Union County Championship was the 84th edition of England's County Championship rugby union club competition.

Gloucestershire won their 15th title after defeating Somerset in the final.

First Round

Semi finals

Final

See also
 English rugby union system
 Rugby union in England

References

Rugby Union County Championship
County Championship (rugby union) seasons